The Big Blue River is the largest tributary of the Kansas River.

It was given its name by the Kansa tribe of Native Americans, who lived at its mouth from 1780 to 1830, and who called it the Great Blue Earth River.

River course
The river passes through mostly agricultural land.  Some of the larger towns along its course, in addition to Manhattan, Kansas, include Beatrice, Nebraska; Crete, Nebraska; and Seward, Nebraska.

Shortly before intersecting with the Kansas River, the Big Blue discharges its waters into a reservoir called Tuttle Creek Lake, which lies slightly northeast of Manhattan.  The reservoir is a man-made flood-control measure, held back by a dam composed of the limestone, silt, and gypsum dredged out of the floodplain by bulldozers left to rust underneath the flooded area.  The land surrounding the reservoir is a state park area, although the Great Flood of 1993 decimated much of the northern area.

The river continues as the outflow from Tuttle Creek Lake for approximately five miles before intersecting with the Kansas River east of Manhattan.

Water rights
Nebraska and Kansas have entered into an agreement of appropriation where Nebraska has full use of the river's water, except that from May 1 to September 30 Nebraska must allow a certain variable flow to pass into Kansas.  To date, there has been no shortage of water in the river.

See also
 List of Kansas rivers
 Lakes, reservoirs, and dams in Kansas
 List of Nebraska rivers

References

External links

 

Rivers of Kansas
Rivers of Nebraska
Rivers of Gage County, Nebraska
Rivers of Seward County, Nebraska
Tributaries of the Kansas River
Rivers of Saline County, Nebraska
Rivers of Riley County, Kansas
Rivers of Marshall County, Kansas